Utqiaġvik (formerly known as Barrow, is the borough seat and largest city of the North Slope Borough in the U.S. state of Alaska. Located north of the Arctic Circle, it is one of the northernmost cities and towns in the world and the northernmost in the United States, with nearby Point Barrow which is the country's northernmost land.

Utqiagvik's population was 4,927 at the 2020 census, an increase from 4,212 in 2010. It is the 12th-most populated city in Alaska.

Name

The location has been home to the Iñupiat, an indigenous Inuit ethnic group, for more than 1,500 years. The city's Iñupiaq name refers to a place for gathering wild roots. It is derived from the Iñupiat word , also used for Claytonia tuberosa ("Eskimo potato"). The name was first recorded, by European explorers, in 1853 as "Ot-ki-a-wing" by Commander Rochfort Maguire, Royal Navy. John Simpson's native map dated 1855 has the name "Otkiawik", which was later misprinted on a British Admiralty chart as "Otkiovik."

The former name Barrow was derived from Point Barrow, and was originally a general designation, because non-native Alaskan residents found it easier to pronounce than the Inupiat name. Point Barrow was named after Sir John Barrow of the British Admiralty by explorer Frederick William Beechey in 1825.  A post office was established in 1901 helping the name "Barrow" to become dominant.

In an October 4, 2016, referendum, city voters narrowly approved changing its name to Utqiaġvik which became official on December 1. City Council member Qaiyaan Harcharek said the name change supports the use of the Iñupiaq language and is part of a decolonization process.

A spelling which is a variant of this name was adopted by the Ukpeaġvik Iñupiat Corporation when it was established in 1973.

History

Prehistory to the 20th century

Archaeological sites in the area indicate the Iñupiat lived around Utqiagvik as far back as 500 AD. Remains of 16 sod dwelling mounds, from the Birnirk culture of about 800, can be seen on the shore of the Arctic Ocean. Located on a slight rise above the high-water mark, they are at risk of being lost to erosion.

Bill Streever who chairs the North Slope Science Initiative's Science Technical Advisory Panel, wrote in his 2009 book Cold: Adventures in the World’s Frozen Places:

British Royal Navy officers came to the area to explore and map the Arctic coastline of North America. The US acquired Alaska in 1867. The United States Army established a meteorological and magnetic research station at Utqiagvik in 1881.

In 1888, a Presbyterian church was built by United States missionaries at Utqiagvik. The church is still in use today. In 1889 a whaling supply and rescue station was built. It is the oldest wood-frame building in Utqiagvik and is listed on the National Register of Historic Places. The rescue station was converted for use in 1896 as the retail Cape Smythe Whaling and Trading Station. In the late 20th century, the building was used as Brower's Cafe.

20th century to the present
A United States Post Office was opened in 1901.

As they took off again, their plane stalled and plunged into a river killing them both. Two memorials have been erected at the location which is now called the Rogers-Post Site. Another memorial is located in Utqiagvik, where the airport was renamed as the Wiley Post–Will Rogers Memorial Airport in their honor.

In 1940, the indigenous Iñupiat organized as the Native Village of Barrow Iñupiat Traditional Government (previously, Native Village of Barrow), which is a federally recognized Alaska Native Iñupiat "tribal entity", as listed by the US Bureau of Indian Affairs around 2003. They wrote a constitution and by-laws, under the provisions of the Indian Reorganization Act (IRA) of 1934. An IRA corporation was also created.

Utqiagvik was incorporated as a first-class city under the name Barrow in 1958. Natural gas lines were brought to the town in 1965, eliminating traditional heating sources such as whale blubber.

The Barrow Duck-In was a civil disobedience event that occurred in the spring of 1961.

The residents of the North Slope were the only Native people to vote on acceptance of the Alaska Native Claims Settlement Act; they rejected it. The act was passed in December 1971, and despite their opposition, became law. The Ukpeaġvik Iñupiat Corporation is the for-profit village corporation established under the act.

In 1972, the North Slope Borough was established. The borough has built sanitation facilities, water and electrical utilities, roads, and fire departments, and established health and educational services in Utqiagvik and the villages of the North Slope with millions of dollars in new revenues from the settlement and later oil revenues.

In 1986, the North Slope Borough created the North Slope Higher Education Center. Renamed Iḷisaġvik College, it is an accredited two-year college providing education which is based on the Iñupiat culture and the needs of the North Slope Borough.

The Tuzzy Consortium Library, in the Iñupiat Heritage Center, serves the communities of the North Slope Borough and functions as the academic library for Iḷisaġvik College. The library was named after Evelyn Tuzroyluk Higbee, an important leader in the community.

Utqiagvik, like many communities in Alaska has enacted a "damp" law, prohibiting the sale of alcoholic beverages. It allows for import, possession, and consumption of such beverages.

In 1988, Utqiagvik became the center of worldwide media attention when three California gray whales became trapped in the ice offshore. After a two-week rescue effort (Operation Breakthrough), a Soviet icebreaker freed two of the whales. Journalist Tom Rose details the rescue and the media frenzy that accompanied it, in his 1989 book Freeing The Whales. The movie Big Miracle is based on the rescue and was released on February 3, 2012.

Geography

Only 2.6% of the Earth's surface lies as far or farther from the equator as Utqiagvik.

Utqiagvik is surrounded by the National Petroleum Reserve–Alaska.

The city of Utqiagvik has three sections, which can be classified as south, central, and north; they are known to residents as Utqiagvik, Browerville, and NARL respectively.

 The southernmost of the sections, known historically as the "Barrow side", is the oldest and second-largest of the three; it serves as downtown. This area includes Wiley Post-Will Rogers Memorial Airport, Barrow High School, North Slope Borough School District, and Fred Ipalook Elementary School, as well as restaurants, hotels, the police station, the Utqiagvik City Hall, a Wells Fargo bank, and numerous houses.

 The central section is the largest of the three and is called Browerville. This has traditionally been a residential area for the City of Utqiagvik, but in recent years, many businesses have opened or moved to this area. Browerville is separated from the south section by a series of lagoons, with two connecting dirt roads. This area in addition to the houses includes Tuzzy Consortium Library, the US Post Office, Eben Hopson Middle School, Samuel Simmonds Memorial Hospital, the Iñupiat Heritage Center, two grocery stores, one hotel, and two restaurants.
 The north section is the smallest and most isolated of the three sections, known to the residents as NARL because it was originally the site of the Naval Arctic Research Lab. It is connected to the central section only by Stevenson Street which is a two-lane dirt road. The NARL facility was transferred by the federal government to the North Slope Borough, which adapted it for use as Iḷisaġvik College. This area also includes a small broadcasting station, which is run by the college students.

An ancient -sized crater, Avak, is situated near Utqiagvik.

Climate

Winter weather can be extremely dangerous because of the combination of cold and wind, while summers are cool even at their warmest. Weather observations are available for Utqiagvik dating back to the late 19th century. The National Oceanic and Atmospheric Administration Climate Monitoring Lab operates in Utqiagvik. The United States Department of Energy  has a climate observation site in Utqiagvik as part of its Atmospheric Radiation Measurement Climate Research Facility.

Despite the extreme northern location, temperatures at Utqiagvik are moderated by the surrounding topography. No wind barriers or protected valleys exist where dense cold air can settle or form temperature inversions in the lower atmosphere, as commonly happens in the interior between the Brooks and the Alaska ranges.

Utqiagvik has the lowest average temperatures of cities in Alaska. Although Utqiagvik rarely records the lowest temperatures statewide during cold waves, extremely low wind chill and "white out" conditions from blowing snow are very common. Temperatures remain below freezing from early October through late May and below  from December through March.

The high temperature reaches or tops the freezing point on an average of only 136 days per year, and 92 days have a maximum at or below . Freezing temperatures and snowfall can occur during any month of the year.

Regarding precipitation Utqiagvik has a desert climate, and averages less than  "rainfall equivalent" per year. Even Sable Island, at around 44 degrees latitude and under the influence of the Gulf Stream, received , or 20 percent more snowfall than Utqiagvik. Snowfall in Utqiagvik has increased in recent years, with an average annual snowfall of  according to the more recent 1991-2020 normals.

The first snow (defined as snow that will not melt until next spring) generally falls during the first week of October, when temperatures cease to rise above freezing during the day. By the end of October, the amount of sunlight is around 6 hours.

When the sun sets on November 18 it will stay below the horizon until January 23, resulting in a polar night that lasts for about 66 days. When the polar night starts,  about 6 hours of civil twilight occur, with the amount decreasing each day during the first half of the polar night. On the winter solstice (around December 21 or December 22), civil twilight in Utqiagvik lasts for a mere 3 hours. After this, the amount of civil twilight increases each day to around 6 hours at the end of the polar night.

Seriously cold weather usually begins in January, and February is generally the coldest month, averaging . By March 1, the sun is up for 9 hours, and temperatures begin to warm, though winds are usually higher. Starting on March 23, no more night (the phase of day) happens, with only daylight and twilight until the start of the midnight sun in May. This is also true from the end of the midnight sun at the beginning of August to September 22. By May 1, the sun is up for 19 hours, and by May 10 or 11 (depending on the year's relationship to the nearest leap year) the sun will stay above the horizon for the entire day. This phenomenon is known as the midnight sun. The sun does not set for 83 days, until either August 1 or 2 (again depending on the year's relationship to the nearest leap year). In May, the temperatures are much warmer, averaging . On June 6, the daily mean temperature rises above freezing, and the normal daily mean temperature remains above freezing until September 21.

Beginning in mid-July, the Arctic Ocean is relatively ice-free, and remains so until late October. Utqiagvik records an average 26 days per year where the high reaches at least . Temperatures above  are rare, but have been recorded in most years. Even in July and August, the low falls to or below the freezing mark on an average of 18 days.

In addition to its low temperatures and polar night, Utqiagvik is one of the cloudiest places on Earth. Owing to the prevailing easterly winds off the Arctic Ocean, it is completely overcast slightly more than 50% of the year. It is at least 70% overcast some 62% of the time. Cloud types are mainly low stratus and fog; cumuli forms are rare. Peak cloudiness occurs in August and September when the ocean is ice-free. Dense fog occurs an average of 65 days per year, mostly in the summer months. Ice fog is very common during the winter months, especially when the temperature drops below .

Variation of wind speed during the year is limited, with the fall days being windiest. Extreme winds from  have been recorded in every month. Winds average  and are typically from the east.

Consequences of global warming

The Arctic region is warming three times the global average, forcing major adjustments to life on the North Slope with regard to a prior millennium of hunting and whaling practices, as well as habitation. Thinner sea ice endangers the landing of bowhead whale strikes on offshore ice by springtime whalers. Caribou habitat is also affected, while thawing soil threatens homes and municipal and commercial structures. The city's infrastructure, particularly water, sanitation, power, and road stability, is endangered. The shoreline is rapidly eroding and has been encroaching on buildings for decades. According to Dr. Harold Wanless of the University of Miami, an anticipated rise in sea level and consequent global warming is inevitable, meaning the existence of Utqiagvik at its current location is doomed in the geological relatively short term. Smoothed data from NOAA show that Utqiagvik has warmed by more than  since 1976. On December 5, 2022, Utqiagvik broke its previous record for the warmest winter temperature, hitting .

Demographics

The town first appeared in census records on the 1880 U.S. Census as the unincorporated Inuit village of "Ootiwakh". All 225 of its residents were Inuit. In 1890, the community and area was returned as the "Cape Smythe Settlements", which was including the refuge and whaling stations, Pengnok, Utkeavie, Kugaru (Inaru) River villages, four other camps and Whaling Steamer Balaena. Of the 246 residents, 189 were Natives, 46 were White, one was Asian, and 10 were other races. This did not include nearby Point Barrow, which was a separate community. In 1900, it reported again as "Cape Smythe Settlements". In 1910, it first reported as Barrow, and in every successive census to 2010. It formally incorporated in 1959. The native name of Utqiagvik was adopted in 2016 and appeared on the 2020 census.

As of the 2010 United States Census, 4,212 people were living in the city. The racial makeup of the city was 60.5% Alaskan Native, 16.2% White, 0.9% African, 8.9% Asian, 2.3% Pacific Islander, and 8.1% from two or more races; 3.1% were Hispanic or Latino of any race.

As of the census of 2000, there were 4,683 people, 1,399 households, and 976 families living in the city. The racial makeup of the city is 57.2% Alaska Native, 21.8% White, 9.4% Asian, 1.0% African American, 1.4% Pacific Islander, 0.7% from other races, and 8.5% from two or more races. Hispanics or Latinos of any race were 3.3% of the population.

Of the 1,399 households,  56.5% had children under 18 living with them, 45.2% were married couples living together, 14.8% had a female householder with no husband present, and 28.0% were not families; 23.0% of all households were made up of individuals, and 1.8% had someone living alone who was 65 or older. The average household size was 3.35, and the average family size was 4.80.

In Utqiagvik, the age distribution was 27.7% under 18, 13.3% from 18 to 24, 31.6% from 25 to 44, 19.4% from 45 to 64, and 3.4% who were 65 or older. The median age was 29 years. For every 100 females, there were 107.1 males. For every 100 females age 18 and over, there were 109.5 males.

The median income for a household in the city was $63,094.09, and the median income for a family was $68,223. Males had a median income of $51,959 versus $46,382 for females. The per capita income for the city was $22,902. About 7.7% of families and 8.6% of the population were below the poverty line, including 7.2% of those under 18 and 13.1% of those 65 and older.

As of December 2022 the town's website says: "The largest city in the North Slope Borough, Utqiagvik has 4,429 residents, of which approximately 61% are Iñupiat Eskimo."

Economy

Utqiagvik is the economic center of the North Slope Borough, the city's primary employer. Many businesses provide support services to oil field operations. State and federal agencies are employers. The midnight sun has attracted tourism, and arts and crafts provide some cash income. Because transporting food to the city is very expensive, many residents continue to rely upon subsistence food sources. Whale, seal, polar bear, walrus, waterfowl, caribou, and fish are harvested from the coast or nearby rivers and lakes. Utqiagvik is the headquarters of the Arctic Slope Regional Corporation, one of the Alaska Native corporations set up following the Alaska Native Claims Settlement Act in 1971 to manage revenues and invest in development for their people in the region.

Arts and culture

Special events

 Kivgiq, the Messenger Feast, in more recent times has been held almost every year, but "officially" is held every two or three years in late January or early February, at the discretion of the North Slope Borough mayor. Kivgiq is an international event that attracts visitors from around the Arctic Circle.
 Piuraagiaqta, the Spring Festival, celebrates breaking a path in the ice for boats to hunt whales. Held in mid-April, it includes many outdoor activities.
 Nalukataq, the Blanket Toss Celebration, is held on multiple days beginning in the third week of June to celebrate each successful spring whale hunt.
 July 4, Independence Day, in Utqiagvik is time for Eskimo games, such as the two-foot high kick and ear pull, with the winners going on to compete at the World Eskimo Indian Olympics.
 Whaling generally happens during the second week of October.
 Qitik, Eskimo Games, also known as Christmas Games, are held from December 26 through January 1.

Depictions in popular culture
Singer-songwriter John Denver visited the town for his 1979 television special Alaska, The American Child.

The ABC TV special “The Night They Saved Christmas” was filmed here, and first aired December 13, 1984.

Fran Tate, a local restaurant owner, was a frequent guest by telephone on a Chicago radio program, the Steve and Johnnie Show on WGN, during the 1990s. She also appeared on the Tonight Show with Johnny Carson.

The town is the setting for a series of horror comic books titled 30 Days of Night. A commercially successful film, named after and based upon the comic, was released on October 19, 2007, followed by a straight-to-video sequel on July 23, 2010.

Karl Pilkington is sent to the town in the second season of An Idiot Abroad.

On the Ice, a film released in 2011 about teenagers dealing with a tragic accidental death, was filmed entirely in the town, with locals acting in most roles.

Big Miracle, a 2012 film starring Drew Barrymore, is based on the true story of whales trapped under ice near Point Barrow, and features scenes in and characters from the town.

Stephen Fry visited the town and its people during the last segment of his documentary Stephen Fry in America.

In 2015, the NFL Network began an eight-part documentary series focusing on the Barrow High School Whalers football team.

Sports

Football

On August 19, 2006, the Whalers of Barrow High School played the first official football game in the Arctic against Delta Junction High School. Barrow High School recorded its first win two weeks later; the coaches and players celebrated the historic win by jumping into the Arctic Ocean, just  from the makeshift dirt field.

On August 17, 2007, the Whalers football team played their first game of the season on their new artificial-turf field. The historic game which was attended by former Miami Dolphins player Larry Csonka, was the first live Internet broadcast of a sporting event in the United States from north of the Arctic Circle.

Since the team's formation, it has gathered a record of 33–24, and most recently, the team reached the semifinal round of the Alaskan State Small School Football Championship.

In 2017, The Barrow High School football team won their first ever state championship with a win against the Homer Mariners 20–14.

Basketball

In 2015, the Barrow High School boys' basketball team won the Alaska Class 3A State Championship with a 50–40 victory over two-time defending state champion, Monroe Catholic. The Whalers' team was led by 5-star recruit Kamaka Hepa. As a 6'7" freshman he was regarded as one of the top basketball recruits in the country. He was ranked as the #21 ranked basketball recruit in the country by ESPN for the class of 2018. Hepa transferred to Jefferson High School in Portland, Oregon, for his junior year. By October 2017, at 6'8" tall, he had committed to go to the University of Texas.

The Whalers' boys' basketball team finished the 2014–2015 season with a 24–3 record, the highest win percentage in school history. Guard Travis Adams was a standout as well. Coach Jeremy Arnhart's teams won 186 games in 10 seasons. In 2015, the Barrow High School girls' team also easily won the ACS tournament.

Education

Utqiagvik is served by the North Slope Borough School District. The schools serving the city are Ipalook Elementary School, Hopson Middle School, Barrow High School, and alternative learning center known as the Kiita Learning Community.
 
Iḷisaġvik College which is a two-year college and the only tribal college in Alaska, is located in Utqiagvik. The school offers associate's degrees in accounting, allied health, business and management, construction technology, dental health therapy, Indigenous education, information technology, Iñupiaq studies, liberal arts, and office management. It also offers a bachelor's degree in business administration. The school additionally offers adult education courses for GED preparation and certificates in various programs. Local students may attend University of Alaska Fairbanks, and other colleges in Alaska and in other states in the country.

Media

Radio
KBRW (AM)/KBRW-FM radio station broadcasts in Utqiagvik on 680 kHz AM and 91.9 MHz FM. KBRW is also broadcast via FM repeaters in all of the North Slope Borough villages, from Kaktovik to Point Hope.

Newspaper
The Arctic Sounder is a newspaper published weekly by Alaska Media, LLC, which covers news of interest to the North Slope Borough, which includes Utqiagvik, and the Northwest Arctic Borough, which includes Kotzebue in northwestern Alaska.

Infrastructure

Transportation
The roads in Utqiagvik are unpaved due to the permafrost, and no roads connect the city to the rest of Alaska. Utqiagvik is served by Alaska Airlines with passenger jet service at the Wiley Post–Will Rogers Memorial Airport from Anchorage and Fairbanks. New service between Fairbanks and Anchorage began from Era Aviation on June 1, 2009. Freight arrives by air cargo year round and by ocean-going marine barges during the annual summer sealift.

Utqiagvik is the transportation hub for the North Slope Borough's Arctic coastal villages. Multiple jet aircraft, with service from Deadhorse (Prudhoe Bay), Fairbanks, and Anchorage provide daily mail, cargo, and passenger services, which connect with smaller single- and twin-engined general aviation aircraft that provide regular service to other villages, from Kaktovik in the east to Point Hope in the west. The town is also served by several radio taxi services, most using small four-wheel drive vehicles.

Health care
Samuel Simmonds Memorial Hospital which is located in the City of Utqiagvik, is the primary healthcare facility for the North Slope region of Alaska. Individuals in need of medical care in the city are able to access the hospital by road. Because no roads lead in or out of Utqiagvik, though, individuals in surrounding communities and towns (including Point Hope, Prudhoe Bay, and Wainwright) must be airlifted in by plane, helicopter, or air ambulance. The facility operates continuously, and is the northernmost hospital or medical facility in the United States.

Notable people
 Sadie Neakok (1916–2004), first female magistrate in Alaska
 Eben Hopson (1922–1980), former member of the Alaska Senate
 Harry Brower Sr. (1924–1992), whaling captain, community leader
 Edna Ahgeak MacLean (born 1944), linguist, educator, and former President of Iḷisaġvik College
 John Nusunginya (1927–1981), former member of the Alaska House of Representatives
 Tara Sweeney (born 1973), former Assistant Secretary at the United States Department of the Interior
 Morgan Kibby (born 1984), actress, singer, songwriter
 Kamaka Hepa (born 2000), college basketball player for the Texas Longhorns and Hawaii Rainbow Warriors

See also

 Arctic Slope Regional Corporation
 Frederick William Beechey and Sir John Barrow
 The blob (Chukchi Sea algae)
 National Petroleum Reserve–Alaska
 Native Village of Barrow Iñupiat Traditional Government
 Naval Arctic Research Laboratory
 North Slope Borough and Alaska North Slope
 Point Barrow whales
 Ukpeaġvik Iñupiat Corporation
 Umiak

Notes

References

Further reading

Further reading
 National Science Foundation Barrow area cartography
 The Papers of Palmer W. Roberts on Eskimos at Point Barrow at Dartmouth College Library
 The Papers of Albert Dekin on the Recovered Remains of the Barrow Inuit Population at Dartmouth College Library
 The Papers of Charles D. Brower, Postmaster of Barrow at Dartmouth College Library

External links

 
 Utqiagvik Sea Ice Webcam
 
 Iñupiat Heritage Center (IHC) - Official museum website
 CAC (Civil Applications Committee)/USGS Global Fiducials Program web page containing scientific description and interactive map viewer featuring declassified high-resolution time-series imagery
 Barrow, Alaska Visitor's Guide
 July 1993 weather record
 Barrow land development 

 
Arctic Slope region
Beaufort Sea
Borough seats in Alaska
Chukchi Sea
Cities in Alaska
Cities in North Slope Borough, Alaska
Populated coastal places in Alaska on the Arctic Ocean
Populated places of the Arctic United States
Road-inaccessible communities of Alaska
Populated places established in the 6th century
6th-century establishments in North America